Weekend Magic is a 1927 German silent romance film directed by Rudolf Walther-Fein and starring Harry Liedtke, Lissy Arna and Gustav Rickelt. It was shot at the Staaken Studios in Berlin. The film's sets were designed by the art directors Botho Höfer and Hans Minzloff.

Cast
 Harry Liedtke as Heinz Sattorius - Neffe Frensens
 Lissy Arna as Marcella Ferrari
 Gustav Rickelt as Jonathan Frensen - Kapitän a.D.
 Erich Kaiser-Titz as Justizrat Mahlau
 Margarete Kupfer as Witwe Lehmann
 Maria Paudler as Fritzi - ihre Tochter
 Fritz Kampers as Wilhelm - ihr Sohn
 Iwa Wanja as Annie Frenzel
 Carl Geppert as Hinnings - Jonathans Diener
 Olaf Storm as Ein junger Künstler
 Frida Richard as Die Wäscherin
 Sophie Pagay as Die Zimmervermieterin
 Hermann Picha as Der Badedirektor
 Heinrich Gotho as Der Eisverkäufer
 Alfred Loretto as Der Wurstmaxe
 Ita Rina

References

Bibliography
 Grange, William. Cultural Chronicle of the Weimar Republic. Scarecrow Press, 2008.

External links 
 

1927 films
1927 romantic comedy films
German romantic comedy films
Films of the Weimar Republic
German silent feature films
Films directed by Rudolf Walther-Fein
German black-and-white films
Silent romantic comedy films
1920s German films
Films shot at Staaken Studios